Begone, Demons ( ukhruj minhā yā malʿūn; also translated as Get Out You Damned, or Get Out of Here, Curse You!) is Saddam Hussein's fourth and last novel. It is a fictional novel, with political metaphor. It is thought to have been written in anticipation of the 2003 Iraq War in 2002 or 2003. It was not yet published before the 2003 Invasion of Iraq. It was published in Japanese in 2006.

Overview
Begone, Demons tells the story of a tribe living on the Euphrates River for more than 1,500 years, after which it is invaded by another tribe, but win the war in the end. The main part of the book focuses on three men: Ishaaq, Yousef, and Mahmud, who under their grandfather Ibrahim grew up as children. Ishaq is a villain and traitor, while the other two, honest and good are heroic. Later Ishaaq leaves and moves to a country west of the Dead Sea. There he joins forces with a greedy governor from Rome, making money together at the expense of the local population. To keep their riches, they eventually build two tall buildings, however, they are attacked: as martyrs, Yousef and Mahmud put "a day on fire" and proceed to die in the flames.

Publication
The book was published in Tokyo by a Japanese publisher, Tokuma Shoten Publishing, in 2006 under the title Devil's Dance ("Akuma no Dance").
8,000 copies were printed, at 256 pages.

It was translated into Turkish by Humam Khalil Abu-Mulal al-Balawi. 

Raghad Hussein had tried to publish the novel in Jordan, and planned to print 100 thousand copies, until the government prevented the publication.

In 2007 the novel was translated into Russian and published in Saint Petersburg by Amfora Publishing House. 5000 copies were printed, at 206 pages. The chief editor of the publishing house Vadim Nazarov said that the novel’s publication was “an ideological initiative” and “a response to pain”. He explained that “when Serbian houses were being bombed, we published Serbian novels. Now we publish Saddam Hussein's book. When he was the leader of Iraq, there was more discipline in this country”.

See also

Saddam Hussein's novels

References

External links
 summary in german
 "Banned, Then Bootlegged, Saddam Hussein the Literary Lion Roars Again" by Hassan M. Fattah
 Aljazeera Magazine article about the novel

Novels by Saddam Hussein
2006 novels